Pachyteles is a genus of beetles in the family Carabidae, containing the following species:

 Pachyteles angulicollis (Schaum, 1863) 
 Pachyteles angustatus Chaudoir, 1868 
 Pachyteles arechavaletae Chaudoir, 1868 
 Pachyteles aspericollis Bates, 1874 
 Pachyteles bacillus Bates, 1881 
 Pachyteles baleni Steinheil, 1875 
 Pachyteles balli Deuve, 2005 
 Pachyteles barclayi Deuve, 2005 
 Pachyteles batesi (Chaudoir, 1868) 
 Pachyteles besckii (Chaudoir, 1854) 
 Pachyteles biguttatus (Solier, 1849) 
 Pachyteles brasiliensis (Gray, 1832) 
 Pachyteles brunneus (Dejean, 1825) 
 Pachyteles cartagoensis Deuve, 2004 
 Pachyteles castaneus (Dejean, 1831) 
 Pachyteles cayennensis (Banninger, 1949) 
 Pachyteles claritarsalis Deuve, 2005 
 Pachyteles colasi Deuve, 2001 
 Pachyteles confusus 
 Pachyteles costaricensis Deuve, 2004 
 Pachyteles cotopaxiensis Deuve, 2005 
 Pachyteles decellei Deuve, 2005 
 Pachyteles delauneyi 
 Pachyteles digiulioi Deuve, 2000 
 Pachyteles distinctus 
 Pachyteles ecuadorensis Deuve, 2005 
 Pachyteles elongatus (Chaudoir, 1854) 
 Pachyteles enischnus 
 Pachyteles excisus 
 Pachyteles filiformis 
 Pachyteles fuliginellus 
 Pachyteles funcki 
 Pachyteles fuscocephalus Deuve, 2001 
 Pachyteles fusculus 
 Pachyteles gibbus 
 Pachyteles glaber (Klug, 1834) 
 Pachyteles goniaderus 
 Pachyteles guyanensis Deuve, 2005
 Pachyteles gyllenhalii (Dejean, 1825) 
 Pachyteles haroldi 
 Pachyteles inflatus 
 Pachyteles kuntzeni (Banninger, 1927) 
 Pachyteles lacordairei 
 Pachyteles laevigatus (Dejean & Boisduval, 1829) 
 Pachyteles longicornis 
 Pachyteles longulus 
 Pachyteles marginicollis (Solier, 1849) 
 Pachyteles mexicanus (Chaudoir, 1848) 
 Pachyteles modestus 
 Pachyteles morio (Klug, 1834) 
 Pachyteles napoensis (Deuve, 2001)
 Pachyteles navattae Deuve, 2005 
 Pachyteles nicaraguensis Bates, 1891 
 Pachyteles nigripennis 
 Pachyteles olivieri Chaudoir, 1868 
 Pachyteles omodon Chaudoir, 1868 
 Pachyteles oxyomus 
 Pachyteles parallelus 
 Pachyteles parca Leconte, 1884 
 Pachyteles parvicollis 
 Pachyteles pascoei Schaum, 1863 
 Pachyteles peruvianus 
 Pachyteles politus (Reiche, 1842) 
 Pachyteles porrectus 
 Pachyteles praeustus 
 Pachyteles punctulatus Chaudoir, 1868 
 Pachyteles rogerii (Dejean, 1825) 
 Pachyteles roubaudi Deuve, 2004 
 Pachyteles semirufus Chaudoir, 1868 
 Pachyteles seriatoporoides Deuve, 2004 
 Pachyteles seriatoporus Chaudoir, 1868 
 Pachyteles seriatus (Chaudoir, 1854) 
 Pachyteles seriepunctatus Chaudoir, 1868
 Pachyteles setifer Bates, 1874 
 Pachyteles striola Perty, 1830 
 Pachyteles sulcipennis Bates, 1874 
 Pachyteles tapajonus Bates, 1874 
 Pachyteles tarsalis (Banninger, 1927) 
 Pachyteles taylorae Deuve, 2005 
 Pachyteles telesfordi (Deuve, 2001) 
 Pachyteles toulgoeti Deuve, 2005 
 Pachyteles trinidadensis Deuve, 2004 
 Pachyteles tuberculatus Perty, 1830 
 Pachyteles undulatus Bates, 1874 
 Pachyteles verruciger Chaudoir, 1868 
 Pachyteles verrucosus Chaudoir, 1868 
 Pachyteles vignai Deuve, 2000

References

Paussinae